Henri Ricard was a French boxer. He competed in the men's bantamweight event at the 1920 Summer Olympics.

1920 Olympic results
Below is the record of Henri Ricard, a French bantamweight boxer who competed at the 1920 Antwerp Olympics:

 Round of 16: defeated Hjalmar Nygaard (Norway)
 Quarterfinal: lost to Chris Graham (Canada)

References

Year of birth missing
Year of death missing
French male boxers
Olympic boxers of France
Boxers at the 1920 Summer Olympics
Place of birth missing
Bantamweight boxers